The Ip is a right tributary of the Barcău in Romania. It flows into the Barcău in the village Ip.

References

Rivers of Romania
Rivers of Sălaj County